The Corps Borussia Bonn is a German Student Corps at the University of Bonn.

History 
Borussia was established on 22 December 1821 and joined the Kösener Senioren-Convents-Verband (KSCV) in 1856. It is the corps of the House of Hohenzollern and – along with others – Prussian nobility.

Karl Marx fought a duel with a Borrussia Corps member in August 1836.

In 1864 and 1883, Borussia headed the KSCV. Notwithstanding some members of the Nazi Party, it refused to expel Jews and dissolved in 1935. It restituted itself in 1949.

Notable members

Princes 
 Frederick II, Grand Duke of Baden 
 Alexis, Prince of Bentheim and Steinfurt
 Duke Paul Frederick of Mecklenburg
 Ernst II, Prince of Hohenlohe-Langenburg
 Frederick Francis IV, Grand Duke of Mecklenburg-Schwerin
 Duke John Albert of Mecklenburg
 Wilhelm II, German Emperor
 Prince Eitel Friedrich of Prussia
 Prince Friedrich Karl of Prussia (1828–1885)
 Prince Friedrich Leopold of Prussia
 Prince Oskar of Prussia
 Wilhelm, German Crown Prince
 Prince Wilhelm of Prussia (1906–1940)
 Charles Edward, Duke of Saxe-Coburg and Gotha
 William Ernest, Grand Duke of Saxe-Weimar-Eisenach
 Prince Friedrich of Saxe-Meiningen
 Prince Adolf of Schaumburg-Lippe
 Ernst Gunther, Duke of Schleswig-Holstein

Ministers 
 Herbert von Bismarck
 Karl Hermann Bitter
 Petre P. Carp
 Johann von Dallwitz
 Botho zu Eulenburg
 Wilhelm von Gayl
 Hans von Rosenberg

Others 

 Adolf Tortilowicz von Batocki-Friebe
 Friedrich von Berg
 Julius von Mirbach
 Friedrich Wilhelm von Prittwitz und Gaffron
 Joseph Maria von Radowitz, Jr.
 Carl Friedrich von Pückler-Burghauss
 Kurt Baron von Schröder
 Peter Yorck von Wartenburg
 Peter Carp

See also 
 List of members of German student corps
 German nobility
 Kingdom of Prussia

References

Further reading 
 Rosco Weber: The German Corps in the Third Reich. Macmillan, London 1986
 Beiträge zur Geschichte des Corps Borussia zu Bonn. Herausgegeben vom Vorstand des Vereins der Alten Herren des Corps Borussia e. V. Bonn 2007 (383 p.).
 Biografisches Corpsalbum des Corps Borussia zu Bonn 1821-2008. Herausgegeben vom Vorstand des Vereins der Alten Herren des Corps Borussia Bonn e. V. Bonn 2008 (458 p.).
 Stephen Klimczuk, Gerald Warner: Secret Places, Hidden Sanctuaries: Uncovering Mysterious Sights, Symbols, and Societies, Sterling Publishing Company, 2009, p. 224-232 (The German University Corps)

External links 

 Share issued to Wilhelm II by Borussia Bonn
 Borussia Bonn (WorldCat)
 Aristocrats in Borussia (1827–1902)
 Caricature (Simplicissimus)
 :de:Liste der Corpsstudenten im Reichstag des Norddeutschen Bundes und im Zollparlament
 :de:Liste der Corpsstudenten im Preußischen Herrenhaus

Borussia Bonn, Corps
University of Bonn alumni
Organizations established in 1821
1821 establishments in Germany
Wilhelm II, German Emperor
House of Hohenzollern